Lot 59 is a township in Kings County, Prince Edward Island, Canada.  It is part of St. Andrew's Parish. Lot 59 was awarded to merchants Hutchison Mure, Robert Cathcart, and David Higgins in the 1767 land lottery.

Communities
Incorporated
Lower Montague
Montague
Valleyfield

Unincorporated
Albion
Commercial Cross
Heatherdale
Kilmuir
Whim Road

References

59
Geography of Kings County, Prince Edward Island